Back into Your System is the third studio album by American rock band Saliva. It reached number 19 on the Billboard 200 and was certified Gold by the Recording Industry Association of America (RIAA) since its release.

Back into Your System spawned its first single, "Always" in late 2002 and reached number 51 on the Billboard Hot 100 and number 1 on the Modern Rock Tracks chart. Its second single was "Rest In Pieces" making several Billboard charts in 2003 and later launching their third single "Raise Up", reaching number 29 on the Mainstream Rock chart.

Promotion
On January 3, 2003, the band announced a 32-city nationwide tour to promote the album, beginning in Jackson, Mississippi's Hal & Mal's and finishing at the London Astoria. Breaking Benjamin and Greenwheel were supporting acts during the U.S. dates and Stone Sour performed on the U.K. portion of the European tour.

Critical reception

Back into Your System received positive reviews from music critics. Brian O'Neill of AllMusic praised the band for making the album more focused in its overall sound and musicianship than Every Six Seconds, concluding that "[The] best thing about Back Into Your System is that the disc doesn't seem to pander to rock radio as much as others of its ilk, but it should still (and did) manage success there regardless." Kaj Roth of Melodic also praised the band's commitment to delving deep into crafting solid musicianship while still retaining a semblance of their given genre. Jon Caramanica, writing for Entertainment Weekly, was mixed on Josey Scott's vocal style but gave note that his band's "unsubtle wall of monster metal ensures they never stray too far from bombast." Bob Waliszewski of Plugged In felt the band delivered mixed messages of positivity and hedonism throughout the album's track list, concluding that "With frothing guitars and drooling drums, the guys in Saliva spit out obscenities, spiritual confusion and a smug addiction to celebrity excess. A few good spots, but the parental advisory label is well-deserved."

Track listing

Enhanced CD also features a playable demo of the PC game Warcraft III: Reign of Chaos.

Credits
Credits adapted from album's liner notes.

Saliva
Josey Scott – lead vocals, acoustic guitar, percussion
Wayne Swinny – lead guitar, backing vocals
Chris D'Abaldo – rhythm guitar, backing vocals
Dave Novotny – bass, backing vocals
Paul Crosby – drums

Production
Bob Marlette – producer
Michael "Elvis" Baskette — engineer
Dave Holdredge — programming
Randy Staub — mixing (tracks 1–8, 10, 11)
Cliff Norrell — mixing (tracks 9, 12)
Stephen Marcussen — mastering

Charts and certifications

Weekly charts

Singles

Year-end charts

Certifications

References

2002 albums
Saliva (band) albums
Island Records albums
Albums produced by Bob Marlette